Ölkofra þáttr (also known as Ölkofra saga), the "Tale of Ölkofri" or the "Tale of Ale-Hood", is a þáttr, a minor Old Norse prose genre related to the sagas of Icelanders. Preserved in the 14th-century manuscript known as Möðruvallabók and other post-Reformation copies, the tale is a satire on the judicial system of the medieval Icelandic Commonwealth. It tells the story of an ale-brewer, named Þórhallr but known as Ölkofri or "Ale-Hood" for the hood that he habitually wears. Ölkofri accidentally sets fire to some valuable woodland belonging to six powerful Icelandic chieftains. These chieftains consequently file suit against him at the Althing in an effort to get him outlawed, but thanks to the efforts of men who unexpectedly come to his aid, Ölkofri manages to escape this fate.

On a side note, the main character's occupation—brewer and seller of ale at the Icelandic Alþing—provides some confirmation that barley was once grown in Iceland during the tail end of a warm phase known as the Medieval Warm Period. Grain could not be cultivated there as the climate cooled and growing seasons shrank.

Critical reception 
In Möðruvallabók the text is rubricated as ‘Ǫlkofra saga’ but has generally been considered as a þáttr in modern critical works on the text. Emily Lethbridge suggests that in treating the Ölkofra text as a þáttr critics "may well be implicitly perpetuating certain hierarchical value judgements founded on assumptions about the relative lengths and narrative value or complexity of sagas (longer, more sophisticated) and þættir (shorter, less sophisticated)."

Bibliography

Editions 

 Digitised at heimskringla.no

 Edition in modern Icelandic spelling

Translations

Secondary literature

References 

Sagas of Icelanders
Þættir